VIA (formerly Volunteers In Asia and Trans-Pacific Exchange) is an independent, non-sectarian, 501(c)(3) non-profit organization dedicated to increasing understanding between the U.S. and Asia. Based in the San Francisco Bay Area and founded in 1963, VIA provides two kinds of programs. VIA's Asia Programs offer Americans the chance to live and volunteer in Asia, while VIA's Stanford Programs enable East Asian university students the opportunity to participate in multi-week themed programs in the United States.

History 
VIA was established during the 1960s, an era of radical social change and questioning in the United States, especially among college students and other youth. In a century that had already seen two massive wars involving numerous countries, and following a decade of relative peace and prosperity fraught with fear over the rise of Communism, Americans in the 1960s increasingly looked to better acquaint themselves with the international community. It was in this era that the Peace Corps, the US government's program sending Americans overseas to volunteer, was established with great success. It was also during this period that the US Congress established the East-West Center in Hawaii, an institution designed to bridge learning between Americans, Asians and Pacific Islanders. Although much smaller in comparison, VIA has also provided a range of educational and exchange opportunities designed to link Asians and Americans, but it has done so without any governmental or religious affiliation.

In 1963, Dwight Clark, then Dean of Freshmen Men at Stanford University, responded to the desire of students to better equip themselves for the future by organizing a group that visited Hong Kong that summer to engage in a variety of volunteer service projects. Thus began a yearly tradition of summer volunteering that was officially established in 1966 as Volunteers in Asia. In response to the Vietnam War, two-year positions were created for conscientious objectors seeking "alternative service" opportunities in Indonesia, Japan, the Philippines, Korea, Taiwan and Nepal.

By the end of the Vietnam War, Volunteers in Asia had firmly established summer programs for undergraduates and two-year programs for college graduates.  The programs were expanded to include students from other Bay Area universities and then, in the late 1990s, nationwide recruitment was instituted.  Over the years, volunteers have been placed in 15 Asian countries, including Bangladesh, China, Hong Kong, Indonesia, Japan, Korea, Laos, Macau, Myanmar, Nepal, Philippines, Sri Lanka, Taiwan, Thailand, and Vietnam.

In the 1970s, VIA added to its offerings by establishing programs designed to expose Asian students to American culture. Originally operating under the name Trans-Pacific Exchange, these opportunities are now called VIA Stanford Programs. The longest-running of these is the American Language and Culture program, which hosts over 150 students each summer.  Participants have come from Japan, Taiwan, Singapore, South Korea and Mainland China. VIA Stanford Programs have taken a variety of themes, but they all strive to give participants the linguistic and cultural skills to excel as global citizens.

Connection with Stanford University 
Throughout its history, VIA has had logistical and cooperative ties with Stanford University in California.  Although never a university program, VIA began as a Stanford student project and for its first years was only available to Stanford University students.  For over four decades, VIA's home office was located on Stanford's campus.  Although VIA's main office moved to San Francisco in 2006, VIA continues to use Stanford facilities to host its Stanford Programs, recruits participants from Stanford's student body and maintains a satellite office on campus. Nonetheless, VIA has always and continues to operate as an entirely independent entity.

Confusion about name 
Whereas the core programs and mission of VIA have not changed, there is often confusion about the name of the organization, currently in its 5th decade.

Current programs 
For US residents, VIA continues to offer one- and two-year volunteer opportunities in Asia. Countries include Cambodia, People's Republic of China, Indonesia, Laos, Myanmar, Thailand and Vietnam. In addition, summer cultural immersion programs are offered in China, Indonesia and Vietnam. Additionally, Stanford students can participate in VIA's Stanford Programs as hosts or student coordinators.  VIA offers six fellowships, two CJ Huang fellowships for Stanford students interested in service in China and four Vietnam Community fellowships for students interested in social work in Vietnam.

For residents of Japan, Taiwan, South Korea and Mainland China, VIA Stanford Programs offers the following opportunities in the spring: Exploring Health Care and Serving American Community. Summer programs include: American Language and Culture, Exploring Social Innovation, and Asia-US Service Learning.

See also
 List of non-governmental organizations in the People's Republic of China
 List of non-governmental organizations in Vietnam
 List of social and non-governmental organisations in Myanmar
 List of non-governmental organizations in Thailand

References

International volunteer organizations
Charities based in California
Foreign charities operating in Vietnam
Foreign charities operating in China
Foreign charities operating in Thailand
Foreign charities operating in Japan
Organizations established in 1963
1963 establishments in California